Clanculus jucundus is a species of sea snail, a marine gastropod mollusk in the family Trochidae, the top snails.

Description
The height of the shell attains 5 mm, its diameter also 5 mm. The small, depressed shell has an ovate-conical shape. It has an ocher or rufous color. The five convex whorls are tessellated near the channeled suture. The base of the shell is rounded. The umbilicus has a crenulate margin. The columella has an acute, prominent denticle. The inner lip is grooved.

Distribution
This marine species was discovered off Sydney, New South Wales.

References

External links
 To Biodiversity Heritage Library (6 publications)
 To World Register of Marine Species

jucundus
Gastropods of Australia
Gastropods described in 1861